TASIS or TASIS Switzerland, formally known as The American School In Switzerland, is a private American international boarding and day school in Switzerland. TASIS is the oldest American college-preparatory boarding school in Europe and consistently ranks as one of Europe's best boarding schools.

Located in Montagnola, Lugano, in the Canton of Ticino, the school enrolls approximately 700 pupils from around the world.

Accreditation

Swiss

TASIS's (upper) secondary education (Middle and High School) is not approved as a Mittelschule/Collège/Liceo by the Swiss Federal State Secretariat for Education, Research and Innovation (SERI).

History

TASIS was founded in 1956 by M. Crist Fleming. For the first few years the school was operating, it was located in Locarno, then in Lugano-Loreto until the purchase of the 17th-century Villa de Nobili in Montagnola in 1960. The school and campus continued to grow throughout the years, adding a post-graduate program in 1959 and summer programs in 1972. Since then, TASIS has expanded to include schools and summer programs in England, Greece, Cyprus, Italy, France, Spain, and Puerto Rico.

In 1983, the US Secretary of Education honored Fleming for her "significant efforts and tremendous contributions towards the furtherance of education at the international level." He stated that the TASIS schools had "introduced thousands of Americans to European culture and civilization" and many foreign students to "the best that America has to offer in its education, culture, and opportunities."

The school is owned by the TASIS Foundation, a non-profit organization. A board of directors is responsible for all aspects of the School's operations. TASIS is accredited by the New England Association of Schools & Colleges and the Council of International Schools.

The school's crest reflects the virtues and values of the school: the tower represents culture humanitas, the lamp wisdom sapientia, the book knowledge scientia, and the sun truth veritas.

Academics
Elementary students follow the Core Knowledge Foundation curriculum as well as an Italian Section curriculum in liaison with cantonal law. Middle and High School students follow a robust, challenging program which includes English-as-an-Additional-Language (EAL) content courses, Advanced Placement courses, and the International Baccalaureate program.

All High School, Middle School and Elementary School students are required to wear school uniforms.

Every January, the campus relocates to the Alps for "Ski Week" in the resort towns of Crans Montana (High School) and Verbier (Middle School).

Arts
TASIS has a tradition of strong arts programs. Performing Arts opportunities include drama, music theater, and instrumental and vocal music. The Palmer Center (2009) offers rehearsal and performance spaces. The Visual Arts is centered around the Ferit Şahenk Fine Arts Center (2012), with purpose-built Photography, Architecture & Design, Ceramics, and Painting studios.

Athletics
TASIS offers competitive soccer, volleyball, basketball, swimming, tennis, badminton, track, cross country, and lacrosse (boys only) at the varsity and junior varsity levels. Students travel throughout Switzerland and Europe for tournaments.

TASIS is a member of the Swiss Group of International Schools (SGIS) conference and were SGIS champions in 2012/13 in varsity boys soccer, varsity boys volleyball, varsity boys basketball, varsity girls basketball, mixed doubles tennis, and middle school boys skiing.

High School soccer teams are a part of the AC Milan Scuola calcio, which is managed in collaboration with AC Milan coaches.

Campus
The TASIS campus is located on the Collina d'Oro, or 'hill of gold', overlooking the city of Lugano and Lake Lugano to the North. The most notable campus building is Villa De Nobili, a 17th-century mansion that still contains the suits of armor placed there when the building was owned by the Marchese De Nobili, Italian Ambassador to Switzerland. It houses dormitories, classrooms, administrative offices, and the school's dining room. Other historic buildings include the 18th-century Hadsall House, which once served as a British consulate building; the 17th-century Casetta, and the 15th-century tower, Casa Fleming.

In 1997, TASIS received cantonal approval for the Global Village Master Plan, an ambitious long-term project tailored to the needs of the school that also serves as a model for sustainable design and community living. Since 1996, Architect and urban designer David Mayernik has created and renovated nine buildings, and the Master Plan is scheduled for completion in 2020.

Campus buildings include classrooms, dormitories, computer labs, a 30,000-volume library, two gymnasiums, art studios, photo labs, music rooms, a theater, two dining halls, and a snack bar and student lounge.

Recent additions to the campus include the Ferit Şahenk Fine Arts Center (2012), and the Campo Science Center (2014).

Notable alumni
Francys Arsentiev, American mountain climber
Jeanie Cunningham, American performer, composer, songwriter, producer, writer
Francesca Gregorini, Italian-American film director and writer
Victor Kraatz, Canadian ice dancer
Jennifer Missoni, Italian actress
Ferit Şahenk, Turkish businessperson
Jack Savoretti, Italian-English singer
Matthew Shepard, American anti-LGBT hate-crime and murder victim
Isaac Tigrett, co-founder of Hard Rock Café and House of Blues
Laura Wasser, American high-profile attorney
Billy Zane, American actor and producer

See also
 TASIS Schools
 TASIS England
 TASIS Portugal
 TASIS Dorado

References

External links

 TASIS Switzerland official website

TASIS
American international schools in Switzerland
Schools in the canton of Ticino
International Baccalaureate schools in Switzerland
Boarding schools in Switzerland
Private schools in Switzerland
Educational institutions established in 1956
1956 establishments in Switzerland